Allen Street is a street in the New York City borough of Manhattan which runs north-south through the Lower Manhattan neighborhood of Chinatown and the Lower East Side.  It is continued north of Houston Street as First Avenue. South of Division Street, it is known as Pike Street to its southern terminus at South Street. The northbound and southbound roadways are separated by a meridian mall, which has two bike lanes located outside the meridian mall; each bike lane is unidirectional. The street's namesake was Master Commandant William Henry Allen, the youngest person to command a Navy ship in the War of 1812. He was killed in action at the age of 28. His exploits included the capture of the British ship HMS Macedonian.

History 

Prior to 1799, this street in lower Manhattan was laid out and named "Chester Street". After the building of the New York Orphan Asylum on this street around May 1806 "Chester Street" was renamed "Asylum Street".  In 1833, "Asylum Street" was quietly renamed Third Street, and finally "Allen Street." 

During its heyday in the early part of the 20th century, it was populated by Romanian Jews, as well as Sephardic Jews from Turkey, Syria, Egypt and Greece. Many worked in brass and copper fabrication shops in the basements, while the wares were sold in street level stores. 
In September 1903, a gun battle was fought beneath the El tracks at Allen and Rivington Streets between followers of Paul Kelly, leader of the Five Points Gang, and the rival gang of Monk Eastman. At one point a hundred men joined the fray, with police driven off by gunfire. Three men were killed and numerous innocent civilians were injured.

Fire destroyed an overcrowded tenement on Allen Street in March 1905, claiming the lives of twenty people. The five-story building at 105 Allen Street housed 200 people.

The street was widened in the early 1930s by demolition of buildings on the east side of the street. This created a broad thoroughfare with a meridian mall in the center and the El running down the western roadway. The El was demolished in 1942.

Allen Street was the site of numerous shops specializing in brassware in the 1910s through the 1940s but only two such shops remained by the late 1970s. In 1979, Allen  Street was described by New York magazine as an "unbusy area removed from the bustle of Grand Street and the Bowery."

The street's center mall, along with that of Pike Street, was reconfigured in 2009. Parts of that mall were reconstructed completely in 2011.

Transportation
A portion of the elevated IRT Second Avenue Line, commonly known as the Second Avenue El, was constructed over Allen Street's current southbound roadway (then the entire street) from Houston Street to Division Street in 1878, blocking out most of the light from the then-narrow street. The elevated railway was taken down in 1942. Currently, the nearest subway stations are Grand Street station, three blocks west at Chrystie Street ( trains) and Delancey Street – Essex Street station, three blocks east at Essex Street ( trains). Also, at the corner of East Houston Street and Allen Street, there are multiple entrances to the Second Avenue station ( train). There is also an intercity bus station at 84-86 Allen Street.

Allen Street is served in its entirety by the M15/M15 SBS bus routes. Part of Pike Street, down to Madison Street, is also serviced by the M15.

References 
Notes

External links

Allen Street Storefronts (A Journey through Chinatown)
New York Songlines: First Avenue with Allen Street
New and Improved Allen Street Bikeway and Plazas
Community Visioning Study for Allen Street Pedestrian Malls - 2008

Chinatown, Manhattan
Streets in Manhattan
Lower East Side